Churilovo is a rural locality (a village) in Chyobsarskoye Urban Settlement, Sheksninsky District, Vologda Oblast, Russia. The population was 12 as of 2002.

Geography 
Churilovo is located 34 km east of Sheksna (the district's administrative centre) by road. Selino is the nearest rural locality.

References 

Rural localities in Sheksninsky District